Postal clerk (abbreviated as PC) was a  United States Navy occupational rating.

Postal clerks:
 Operate US Navy post offices
 Supervise, organize and establish or disestablish a US Navy post office
 Perform postal counter work, including sale of stamps and money orders
 Process incoming and outgoing mail
 Route mail
 Maintain a mail directory
 Process official mail
 Maintain security of postal effects and mail matter
 Process claims and inquiries
 Prepare and file postal correspondence, records and reports

Rating merger
Effective 1 October 2009, the ratings of storekeeper (SK) and postal clerk (PC) have merged to become logistics specialist (LS).

References

See also
List of United States Navy ratings

United States Navy ratings